Christopher F. Chyba is an American astrobiologist, and Professor of Astrophysical Sciences and International Affairs at the Woodrow Wilson School, Princeton University.

He graduated from Swarthmore College in 1982, and studied mathematical physics at the University of Cambridge as a Marshall Scholar. He then received his Ph.D. in Astronomy, with an emphasis in Planetary Science, from Cornell University in 1991. He was a White House Fellow on the National Security Council staff, and then serving in the Office of Science and Technology Policy (OSTP) from 1993 to 1995. He was a member of the SETI Institute Board of Trustees from 2005 - 2007.

Awards and honors 
 2001 MacArthur Fellows Program
 The asteroid 7923 Chyba was named in his honor

Works
"Commencement Address", June 1, 2003
"Contingency and the Cosmic Prospective", The new astronomy: opening the electromagnetic window and expanding our view of planet earth, Editor D. Wayne Orchiston, Springer, 2005, 
Comets and the origin and evolution of life, Editors Paul J. Thomas, Christopher F. Chyba, Springer, 2006, 
U.S. nuclear weapons policy: confronting today's threats, Editors George Bunn, Christopher F. Chyba, William James Perry, Center for International Security and Cooperation, Freeman Spogli Institute for International Studies, Stanford, Calif., 2006,

References

External links

"Christopher Chyba", Huffington Post

21st-century American physicists
Living people
Office of Science and Technology Policy officials
Swarthmore College alumni
Alumni of the University of Cambridge
Cornell University alumni
MacArthur Fellows
Year of birth missing (living people)
Princeton University faculty
Astrobiologists
Marshall Scholars
Planetary scientists
Recipients of the Presidential Early Career Award for Scientists and Engineers